Jacopo Barbello (1590–1656) was an Italian painter of the Baroque period. Born in Cremona, He trained in Naples. Painted in Brescia and Bergamo.

References

1590 births
1656 deaths
16th-century Italian painters
Italian male painters
17th-century Italian painters
Italian Baroque painters